Lambton is a municipality of about 1600 people in Le Granit Regional County Municipality in the Estrie region of Quebec, Canada.

Lambton is mostly rural and agricultural area with some business on the two main roads in town.

Transportation

The main roads connecting Lambton are Route 108 and Route 263.

References

External links

Municipalities in Quebec
Incorporated places in Estrie
Le Granit Regional County Municipality